Wynn is a surname of Welsh origin. Wynn and its variant Wynne are derived from the north Wales and Shropshire form (with initial mutation) of south Wales Gwyn(n), Gwynne. (However it may sometimes be a form of Winn.) 

It may refer to:

 Albert Wynn, former Democratic congressman from Maryland
 DeShawn Wynn, running back for the Green Bay Packers
 Dylan Wynn, American football player
 Ed Wynn, American comedian and actor
 Graeme Wynn, Australian rugby league footballer
 Henry Wynn, British statistician
 Hugh Wynn (1897–1936), American film editor
 Klaas Wynne, professor of chemistry at University of Glasgow
 Isaiah Wynn, American football player
 Big Jim Wynn, American saxophonist
 Jimmy Wynn, American Major League Baseball player
 John Wynn (disambiguation), various people
 Keenan Wynn, American actor
 May Wynn (1928–2021), American actress
 Natalie Wynn (born 1988), American YouTube personality
 Ned Wynn (1941–2020), American actor and screenwriter
 Sir Owen Wynn, 3rd Baronet (1592–1660)
 Peter Wynn, Australian rugby league player
 Peter Wynn (1931–2017), English mathematician
 Phail Wynn (c. 1948–2018), American academic administrator
 Sir Richard Wynn, 4th Baronet (1625–1674)
 Spergon Wynn, NFL & CFL quarterback
 Steve Wynn, casino resort developer
 Steve Wynn (musician)
 The Wynn baronets, baronetcies of the County of Carnarvon

Footnotes